The 2002 Asian Badminton Championships was the 21st edition of the Asian Badminton Championships. It was held in Nimibutr Stadium, Bangkok, Thailand from 13 to 17 November 2002.

Medalists

Medal table

Finals

Semi-finals

References

External links 
 Tournament result at www.tournamentsoftware.com

Asia Championships
Badminton, Asia Championships
 in Asian sport
Badminton, Asia Championships
Asia Championships
Asia Championships
Badminton Asia Championships
Badminton, Asia Championships